Rhopalosiphum nymphaeae, the waterlily aphid, is a species of aphid in the family Aphididae. It is found in Europe.

References

External links

 

Aphidini
Articles created by Qbugbot
Insects described in 1761
Taxa named by Carl Linnaeus
Insect pests of millets